Richard Yarward or Yearwood (1580–1632) was an English grocer and politician who sat in the House of Commons at various times between 1614 and 1629.

Yarward was a grocer of Southwark. He was elected Member of Parliament for Southwark in 1614, and was re-elected in 1621, 1624, 1625, 1626 and 1628, sitting until 1629 when King Charles decided to rule without parliament for eleven years.

Yarwood is identified in the Dictionary of National Biography, under the name Yarwood or Yearwood as the stepfather of John Harvard who gave his name to Harvard College. He married Katherine (née Rogers), who was the widow of Robert Harvard and then John Elletson, at Wandsworth on 28 May 1627. She had come into possession of the "Queen's Head" in Borough High Street from her second husband.

References

People from Southwark
British grocers
1580 births
1632 deaths
English MPs 1614
English MPs 1621–1622
English MPs 1624–1625
English MPs 1625
English MPs 1626
English MPs 1628–1629